Irish Heartland is the eleventh studio album by English-Irish country singer Nathan Carter. It was released in Ireland on 8 November 2019 by Sharpe Music. The album peaked at number fourteen on the Irish Albums Chart.

Background
According to Sharpe Music, Nathan Carter "takes listeners on a musical journey through his beloved Irish Heartland". The album features collaborations with artists including The High Kings, Finbar Furey and Cherrish the Ladies, and an orchestral accompaniment from the Bulgarian Symphony Orchestra. Speaking ahead of the album release, Carter said, "Over the years, I have adored performing folk music everywhere from Fleadh Ceoils to theatres and arenas across the world. Wherever I play, these songs are now some of the most popular on my set list and I play them with immense pride."

Track listing

Charts

Release history

References

2019 albums
Nathan Carter albums